

Gerhard Schmidhuber (9 April 1894 – 11 February 1945) was a German general during World War II. He was born in Saxony and in 1914 was a reserve officer in the Imperial German Army.  He left the army in 1920 and rejoined in 1934. He had served in both France and in the Soviet Union campaigns as a battalion and regimental commander. He was a recipient of the Knight's Cross of the Iron Cross with Oak Leaves. Schmidhuber was commanding officer of the 13th Panzer Division during World War II. When the Germans occupied Hungary in 1944, Schmidhuber was supreme commander of German army forces in that country. According to Pál Szalai, he prevented the liquidation of Budapest Jewish ghetto by Hungarian Arrow Cross gangs, although his exact role remains disputed. Schmidhuber was killed in action in the Battle of Budapest.

Awards
 Iron Cross (1914) 2nd Class (9 May 1915) &1st Class (7 December 1917)
 Clasp to the Iron Cross (1939) 2nd Class (29 September 1939) & 1st Class (24 June 1940)
 German Cross in Gold on 28 February 1942 as Oberstleutnant in the II./Schützen-Regiment 103
 Knight's Cross of the Iron Cross with Oak Leaves
 Knight's Cross on 18 October 1943 as Oberst and commander of Panzergrenadier-Regiment 304
 Oak Leaves on 21 January 1945 as Generalmajor and commander of the 13.Panzer-Division

References

Citations

Bibliography

 
 
 

1894 births
1945 deaths
Military personnel from Dresden
Major generals of the German Army (Wehrmacht)
German Army personnel of World War I
Recipients of the clasp to the Iron Cross, 1st class
People from the Kingdom of Saxony
Recipients of the Gold German Cross
Recipients of the Knight's Cross of the Iron Cross with Oak Leaves
Raoul Wallenberg
German Army personnel killed in World War II
German Army generals of World War II